KEPR-TV (channel 19) is a television station licensed to Pasco, Washington, United States, serving the Tri-Cities area as an affiliate of CBS and The CW Plus. Owned by Sinclair Broadcast Group, the station maintains studios on West Lewis Street (US 395) in Pasco and a transmitter on Johnson Butte near Kennewick.

Although identifying as a station in its own right, KEPR is considered a semi-satellite of KIMA-TV (channel 29) in Yakima, which operates another semi-satellite, KLEW-TV (channel 3) in Lewiston, Idaho. KEPR and KLEW simulcast all network and syndicated programming as provided through KIMA, but air separate commercial inserts, legal identifications and early evening newscasts, and have their own websites. KEPR is also sister to low-powered Class A Univision affiliate KVVK-CD (channel 15). Master control and some internal operations for the four stations are based at KOMO Plaza (formerly Fisher Plaza) in Seattle.

On satellite, Dish Network and DirecTV carry both KEPR-TV and KIMA-TV.

History
KEPR-TV went on the air for the first time December 28, 1954, as a satellite of KIMA-TV. It was owned by Cascade Broadcasting Company, which also owned 40 percent of KWIE (610 AM) in Kennewick. Cascade bought the remaining 60 percent of KWIE in 1956 and changed its call letters to KEPR, matching the television station, the following year.

A few years earlier, the Federal Communications Commission (FCC) collapsed all of central Washington into one giant television market. However, this market was designated a "UHF island" due to being sandwiched between Seattle to the west, Spokane to the east and Portland to the south. It soon became apparent that one full-power UHF station would not nearly be enough for adequate coverage of this vast and mountainous area. KEPR-TV thus signed on as the first station in the United States to be a satellite of another.

Original plans called for it to be a straight repeater of KIMA-TV, apart from station identifications. However, it soon became apparent that Tri-Cities residents wanted a more local station. Monte Strohl, who until then had been a radio salesman at KIMA, was installed as the first manager-salesman of KEPR-TV. The station also added a separate news department.

Like its parent station, KEPR-TV carried programming from all three networks, but was a primary CBS affiliate. It lost NBC in 1965 when KNDU (channel 25) followed the lead of parent station KNDO (channel 23) and became a full-time NBC affiliate, and lost ABC when KVEW (channel 42) signed on along with parent KAPP (channel 35) in 1970. During the 1970s, the two stations co-branded as "Cascade TV."

KEPR produces Community Health Journal with Jim Hall, a former anchorman for the station who is now with Kadlec Medical Center in Richland. The program has aired for 15 years, making it one of the longest-running magazine programs in the market.

Filmways agreed to purchase Cascade Broadcasting for $3 million in 1968; the sale was approved the following year. Cascade's previous owners retained the company's radio stations, which by this point also included KEPR-FM (105.3 FM), under the name Yakima Valley Communications; the KEPR radio stations then changed their call letters to KONA and KONA-FM. Filmways sold KEPR-TV, KIMA-TV, and KLEW-TV to NWG Broadcasting for $1 million in 1972. Retlaw Enterprises acquired the NWG stations for $17 million in 1986; the stations were operated as part of the Retlaw Broadcasting division. Fisher Communications purchased KEPR-TV along with the other Retlaw owned stations in 1999.

In 2000, KEPR became the first station in the Tri-Cities to broadcast a digital signal with the activation of a low-power, standard-definition signal on channel 18; this was upgraded to a full-power, high-definition signal in 2007. The digital signal remained on channel 18 following the end of analog broadcasting in 2009, using PSIP to display its virtual channel as 19.

On March 30, 2009, KEPR launched a digital subchannel affiliated with The CW, filling the void left by KCWK (channel 9) going dark at the end of May 2008 due to the Pappas Telecasting bankruptcy. The subchannel subsequently took KCWK's former channel 9 position on local cable systems.  As had been the case with KCWK, programming is primarily sourced from the network's CW Plus feed, along with a local 10 p.m. newscast.

On April 11, 2013, Fisher announced that it would sell its properties, including KEPR-TV, to the Sinclair Broadcast Group. The deal was completed on August 8, 2013.

Programming

Syndicated programming
Current syndicated programs on KEPR include The Kelly Clarkson Show, Dr. Phil, Judge Judy, The Big Bang Theory, and The Simpsons, which has aired at 7:30 p.m. for a majority of the time since it went into syndication in the fall of 1994.

News operation
KEPR's morning, 10 p.m. (on CW), 11 p.m. and weekend newscasts are shared with KIMA-TV. Branded as KIMA/KEPR Action News, they cover both the Columbia Basin and the Yakima Valley. KEPR continues to produce its own 5 and 6 p.m. weekday newscasts. There are no noon newscasts unlike most CBS affiliates.

Subchannels
The station's digital signal is multiplexed:

See also
Channel 9 branded TV stations in the United States
Channel 18 digital TV stations in the United States
Channel 19 virtual TV stations in the United States

References

External links

CBS network affiliates
TBD (TV network) affiliates
Sinclair Broadcast Group
Tri-Cities, Washington
Television channels and stations established in 1954
1954 establishments in Washington (state)
EPR-TV